Condobolin Airport  is a small registered aerodrome located  northeast of Condobolin, New South Wales, Australia. The Lachlan Shire Council currently maintains the airport.

See also
List of airports in New South Wales

References

Airports in New South Wales